Tibor is a masculine given name found throughout Europe.

There are several explanations for the origin of the name:
 from Latin name Tiberius, which means "from Tiber", Tiber being a river in Rome.
 in old Slavic languages, Tibor means "sacred place".
 shortened form of the name Tiborc; which originates from the ancient Latin surname Tiburtius.
 from Etruscan name Tibur, which means "honest man"

Some notable people known by this name include:

 Tibor Antalpéter
 Tibor Benedek
 Tibor Farkas
 Tibor Feheregyhazi
 Tibor Fischer
 Tibor Gécsek
 Tibor Hollo
 Tibor Kalman
 Tibor R. Machan
 Tibor Mičinec
 Tibor Nyilasi
 Tibor Ordina
 Tibor Parák
 Tibor Pleiß
 Tibor Radó
 Tibor Renyi
 Tibor Selymes
 Tibor Stark
 Tibor Szasz
 Tibor Szele
 Tibor Varga (ice hockey)
 Tibor Varga (violinist)
 Tibor Viniczai
 Tibor Zsitvay

See also
 Ctibor (name)
 Tibor is the Hungarian name for Tibru village, Cricău Commune, Alba County, Romania
 TIBOR is the short name for the Tokyo Interbank Offered Rate

References 

Hungarian masculine given names